Gone with the Wind is a jazz album released by The Dave Brubeck Quartet in 1959 on Columbia CL 1347 (monophonic) and CS 8156 (stereo).

The origin of the album came out of the Quartet's desire to create an album of original music using unusual meters they discovered abroad such as in traditional Turkish folk music, a project which became Time Out. However, the label executives insisted that the band first create a more conventional album to cover the risk of their preferred concept.

The album was recorded in Los Angeles, California on April 22 and 23, 1959. It is a concept album paying tribute to the State of Georgia and to the American South more generally. For this album, the quartet members picked personal favorites.  Eugene Wright selected "Ol' Man River". "Short'nin Bread" was a pick of Joe Morello.  Favored by Paul Desmond were "Lonesome Road" and "Basin Street" with Dave Brubeck choosing "Georgia on my Mind" along with "Swanee River".  The album has received such reviews as "All... you would expect from Dave Brubeck", the "most swinging" album recorded up to that point, and as one of the "classic" Dave Brubeck Quartet lineup's lesser efforts. By contrast, Time Out was highly successful and eventually hailed as a landmark achievement in the genre.

Track listing

Personnel
The Dave Brubeck Quartet:
 Paul Desmond - alto sax
 Joe Morello - drums
 Gene Wright - bass
 Dave Brubeck - piano

References

1959 albums
Dave Brubeck albums
Columbia Records albums
Concept albums